Cascade is a settlement in Jamaica.

References

External links
 Geographical location at Cascade, Jamaica at Maplandia

Populated places in Hanover Parish